Statistics of Danish 1st Division in the 1956/1957 season.

Overview
It was contested by 10 teams, and Aarhus Gymnastikforening won the championship.

It had been decided that the league would follow the calendar year with start in March and end in late October/early November, the league therefore played an extra half-season.

League standings

Results

Matchday 1–18

Matchday 19–27

References
Denmark - List of final tables (RSSSF)

Danish 1st Division seasons
Dan
1956–57 in Danish football
Top level Danish football league seasons